In geometry, isotoxal polyhedra and tilings are defined by the property that they have symmetries taking any edge to any other edge. Polyhedra with this property can also be called "edge-transitive", but they should be distinguished from edge-transitive graphs, where the symmetries are combinatorial rather than geometric.

Regular polyhedra are isohedral (face-transitive), isogonal (vertex-transitive), and isotoxal (edge-transitive).

Quasiregular polyhedra are isogonal and isotoxal, but not isohedral; their duals are isohedral and isotoxal, but not isogonal.

The dual of an isotoxal polyhedron is also an isotoxal polyhedron. (See the Dual polyhedron article.)

Convex isotoxal polyhedra 
The dual of a convex polyhedron is also a convex polyhedron.

There are nine convex isotoxal polyhedra based on the Platonic solids: the five (regular) Platonic solids, the two (quasiregular) common cores of dual Platonic solids, and their two duals.

The vertex figures of the quasiregular forms are (squares or) rectangles; the vertex figures of the duals of the quasiregular forms are (equilateral triangles and equilateral triangles, or) equilateral triangles and squares, or equilateral triangles and regular pentagons.

Isotoxal star-polyhedra 
The dual of a non-convex polyhedron is also a non-convex polyhedron. (By contraposition.)

There are ten non-convex isotoxal polyhedra based on the quasiregular octahedron, cuboctahedron, and icosidodecahedron: the five (quasiregular) hemipolyhedra based on the quasiregular octahedron, cuboctahedron, and icosidodecahedron, and their five (infinite) duals:

(*) Faces, edges, and intersection points are the same; only, some other of these intersection points, not at infinity, are considered as vertices.

There are sixteen non-convex isotoxal polyhedra based on the Kepler–Poinsot polyhedra: the four (regular) Kepler–Poinsot polyhedra, the six (quasiregular) common cores of dual Kepler–Poinsot polyhedra (including four hemipolyhedra), and their six duals (including four (infinite) hemipolyhedron-duals):

Finally, there are six other non-convex isotoxal polyhedra: the three quasiregular ditrigonal (3 | p q) star polyhedra, and their three duals:

Isotoxal tilings of the Euclidean plane 

There are at least 5 polygonal tilings of the Euclidean plane that are isotoxal. (The self-dual square tiling recreates itself in all four forms.)

Isotoxal tilings of the hyperbolic plane 

There are infinitely many isotoxal polygonal tilings of the hyperbolic plane, including the Wythoff constructions from the regular hyperbolic tilings {p,q}, and non-right (p q r) groups.

Here are six (p q 2) families, each with two regular forms, and one quasiregular form. All have rhombic duals of the quasiregular form, but only one is shown:

Here's 3 example (p q r) families, each with 3 quasiregular forms. The duals are not shown, but have isotoxal hexagonal and octagonal faces.

Isotoxal tilings of the sphere 

All isotoxal polyhedra listed above can be made as isotoxal tilings of the sphere.

In addition as spherical tilings, there are two other families which are degenerate as polyhedra. Even ordered hosohedron can be semiregular, alternating two lunes, and thus isotoxal:
 hosohedron {2,q}
 dihedron {p,2}

References 

  (6.4 Isotoxal tilings, 309–321)

 
Polyhedra